Willard Johnson may refer to:

 Willard Johnson (politician) (1820–1900), American businessman and politician
 Willard Johnson (political scientist) (born 1935), American political scientist and African Studies expert
 Willard Drake Johnson (1860–1917), American glaciologist and cartographer
 Susannah Willard Johnson (1729/30–1810), American settler captured in Abekani raid
 SS Willard R. Johnson, a Liberty Ship